Naghmet Hob (also romanized as Naghmat Hob) is the fourth album by Najwa Karam, released by the Rotana label in 1994. It was her breakthrough, which made her a star in the Arabic-music world.

Track listing
 "Law Habaytak (If I Loved You)"
 "Elala (La La)"
 "Law Ma Kenna (If We Weren't Here)"
 "Al Ors (The Wedding)"
 "Helm Ennar (Dreams of Courage)"
 "Wrood Eddar (Roses of the Garden)"
 "Naghmet Hob (The Rhythm of Love)"

1994 albums
Najwa Karam albums
Rotana Records albums